A STUFT (acronym for ship taken up from trade) is a UK civilian ship requisitioned for government use.

The Falklands War of 1982 saw a diversity of ships taken up from trade, including tankers with potable water (see British logistics in the Falklands War) and fuels, freighters carrying food and munitions, and luxury liners converted to carry troops.

References

External links
 Thinkdefence.co.uk information and pictures of Falklands conflict STUFT – ships taken up from trade
 Detailed Article on STUFT written by Commander Nick Messinger RD FNI RNR comprehensively detailing the roles of UK STUFT within the Falklands conflict. Published January 1983.

Ship types